The suburb of Parramatta; a major commercial centre in the metropolitan area of Sydney, New South Wales, Australia, is home to numerous skyscrapers and high-rise buildings. Of those completed or topped out, there are 11 buildings which reach a height of at least 100 metres (328 ft), of which 5 reach a height of at least 150 metres (492 ft). In accordance with CTBUH guidelines, heights are measured to the structural height, which includes architectural elements, such as spires, but not communications antennas. Structures are not included.

Tallest completed and topped out buildings 
This is a list of the tallest buildings in Parramatta which are completed or topped out:

Proposed, approved and under construction buildings 
This is a list of the tallest buildings in Parramatta which are proposed, approved or under construction:

See also 
 List of tallest buildings in Sydney
 List of tallest buildings in Australia
 List of tallest buildings in Oceania

References

External links 
 Parramatta - Emporis

Parramatta
Tallest buildings
Tallest buildings in Parramatta